Deanna Lynne Wiener (born March 23, 1953) is an American politician in the state of Minnesota. She served in the Minnesota State Senate and is a Democrat.

References

1953 births
Living people
People from Eagan, Minnesota
People from Ramsey County, Minnesota
Businesspeople from Minnesota
Women state legislators in Minnesota
Democratic Party Minnesota state senators
21st-century American women